Ron Boyle (born 25 August 1947) is an Australian former cyclist. He competed in the sprint event at the 1976 Summer Olympics.

References

External links
 

1947 births
Living people
Australian male cyclists
Olympic cyclists of Australia
Cyclists at the 1976 Summer Olympics
Place of birth missing (living people)
Commonwealth Games medallists in cycling
Commonwealth Games bronze medallists for Australia
Cyclists at the 1978 Commonwealth Games
Medallists at the 1978 Commonwealth Games